Yadviha Skorabahataya (born 10 June 1968) is a Belarusian visually impaired Paralympic skier.

She participated at the 2002 Winter Paralympics, 2006 Winter Paralympics, 2010 Winter Paralympics, 2014 Winter Paralympics, 2018 Winter Paralympics.

See also 
 Cross-country skiing at the 2002 Winter Paralympics
 Cross-country skiing at the 2006 Winter Paralympics
 Cross-country skiing at the 2010 Winter Paralympics
 Cross-country skiing at the 2014 Winter Paralympics
 Cross-country skiing at the 2018 Winter Paralympics

References

External links 
 

Living people
1968 births
Belarusian female cross-country skiers
Paralympic gold medalists for Belarus
Paralympic silver medalists for Belarus
Medalists at the 2014 Winter Paralympics
Belarusian people with disabilities
Blind people
Cross-country skiers at the 2002 Winter Paralympics
Cross-country skiers at the 2006 Winter Paralympics
Cross-country skiers at the 2010 Winter Paralympics
Cross-country skiers at the 2014 Winter Paralympics
Cross-country skiers at the 2018 Winter Paralympics
Visually impaired category Paralympic competitors
Paralympic medalists in cross-country skiing
Paralympic cross-country skiers of Belarus